Phelsuma hielscheri is a species of gecko, a lizard in the family Gekkonidae. The species is endemic to Madagascar.

Etymology
The specific name, hielscheri, is in honor of German biochemist Michael Hielscher who was one of the discoverers of this species.

Geographic range

Description
Males of P. hielscheri are larger than females.

Habitat
Phelsuma hielscheri is found on screw palms (Pandanus) in both wild and urban settings.

Reproduction
Phelsuma hielscheri is oviparous.

References

Further reading
Rösler H, Obst FJ, Seipp R (2001). "Eine neue Taggekko-Art von Westmadagaskar Phelsuma hielscheri sp. n. (Reptilia: Sauria: Gekkonidae) ". Zoologische Abhandlungen, Museum für Tierkunde Dresden 51 (6): 51–60. (Phelsuma hielscheri, new species). (in German).

Phelsuma
Reptiles described in 2001
Reptiles of Africa
Reptiles of Madagascar
Endemic fauna of Madagascar